The Indonesia national baseball team is the national baseball team of Indonesia. The team represents Indonesia in international competitions.

Competitive records
Asian Baseball Championship Div 1
2001 – 6th place
2003 – 6th place
2009 – 7th place
2015 – 5th place

Asian Baseball Championship Div 2
2001 –  1st place
2009 –  1st place

Asian Games
2018 – 7th place

Southeast Asian Games
2005 –  3rd place
2007 –  3rd place
2011 –  2nd place
2019 –  3rd place

References

National baseball teams in Asia
Baseball
National team